Hanne Borchsenius (30 November 1935 – 19 March 2012) was a Danish film actress. She appeared in 32 films between 1956 and 1988.

Filmography

 The Girl in a Swing (1988)
 Kampen om den røde ko (1987)
 Misantropen (1974)
 Dukkehjem, Et (1974)
 Askepot (1973)
 Og så er der bal bagefter (1970)
 Mellem fem og syv (1970)
 Der kom en soldat (1969)
 Min søsters børn vælter byen (1968)
 Dage i min fars hus (1968)
 Martha (1967)
 Slap af, Frede! (1966)
 Naboerne (1966)
 Passer passer piger (1965)
 Premiere i helvede (1964)
 This Is Denmark (1964)
 Alt for kvinden (1964)
 Majorens oppasser (1964)
 Støv for alle pengene (1963)
 Vi voksne (1963)
 Tre piger i Paris (1963)
 Pigen og pressefotografen (1963)
 Det støver stadig (1962)
 Det stod i avisen (1962)
 Han, Hun, Dirch og Dario (1962)
 Landsbylægen (1961)
 Far til fire med fuld musik (1961)
 Støv på hjernen (1961)
 Sorte Shara (1961)
 Løgn og løvebrøl (1961)
 Natlogi betalt (1957)
 Ung leg (1956)

References

External links

1935 births
2012 deaths
Danish film actresses
People from Frederiksberg